Anne Blanc (born 20 July 1966) is a French politician of La République En Marche! (LREM) who served as a member of the French National Assembly from 2017 to 2022, representing the department of Aveyron.

Political career
In parliament, Blanc served on the Committee on Economic Affairs. In addition to her committee assignments, she chaired the French-Brazilian Parliamentary Friendship Group.

Political positions
In April 2018, Blanc joined other co-signatories around Sébastien Nadot in officially filing a request for a commission of inquiry into the legality of French weapons sales to the Saudi-led coalition fighting in Yemen, days before an official visit of Saudi Crown Prince Mohammed bin Salman to Paris.

In July 2019, Blanc decided not to align with her parliamentary group's majority and became one of 52 LREM members who abstained from a vote on the French ratification of the European Union’s Comprehensive Economic and Trade Agreement (CETA) with Canada.

See also
 2017 French legislative election

References

1966 births
Living people
Deputies of the 15th National Assembly of the French Fifth Republic
La République En Marche! politicians
21st-century French women politicians
People from Aveyron
Women members of the National Assembly (France)
Radical Party of the Left politicians
Members of Parliament for Aveyron